West Mountain is a mountain in Albany County, New York. It is located east-northeast of Huntersland. East Hill is located east-northeast and Cook Hill is located southwest of West Mountain.

References

Mountains of Albany County, New York
Mountains of New York (state)